Choa Chu Kang MRT/LRT station is an above-ground Mass Rapid Transit (MRT) and Light Rail Transit (LRT) interchange station in Choa Chu Kang, Singapore. It is an interchange between the North South line and Bukit Panjang LRT, serving as the western terminus of the latter. The station is located between Choa Chu Kang Bus Interchange and Lot One in the Choa Chu Kang town centre.

Currently, the station's LRT platform is the only station on the Bukit Panjang LRT to use a Spanish solution, and is the second rail station in Singapore to use such a configuration after VivoCity station on the Sentosa Express.

Choa Chu Kang station is proposed to become an interchange with the Jurong Region line, which is slated for completion in 2027. It will be the northern terminus of the Main Branch of the Jurong Region line. Trains entering service at this station will terminate at Boon Lay via Bahar Junction.

History

The contract for the construction of Choa Chu Kang station was awarded to a Taiwanese-Singapore joint venture (RSEA International-Hock Lian Seng) at a contract sum of S$99.8 million in January 1986. The contract also includes the construction of the Jurong, Bukit Batok and Bukit Gombak stations and the  viaducts. Construction began on 15 February 1986.

The MRT station was opened on 10 March 1990 and was the terminus of the Branch line. With the opening of the North South line Woodlands Extension on 10 February 1996, the branch line was incorporated into the North South line. The LRT station opened on 6 November 1999, alongside the rest of the Bukit Panjang LRT line. The station was third one to have an Xchange after those in the underground Dhoby Ghaut and Raffles Place, making the station the first to have an Xchange above-ground and in a residential neighbourhood.

Since 26 August 2011, automatic platform gates were installed on the North South line platforms and commenced operation on 21 October that year. HVLS fans in the MRT platform commenced operations on 10 October 2012. The LRT platform also features fans as of 27 September 2015.

New LRT platforms

On 31 October 2012, the Land Transport Authority (LTA) announced that Choa Chu Kang LRT station will have two more platforms, specifically for commuters to exit the trains to allow the existing platform in the centre to have more space to cater to boarding passengers. There will also be additional fare gates and a new covered linkway from the LRT station to Lot One. These new additions which also include widening the staircase between the MRT and the LRT stations were completed in 2016. New Exit E was opened at the same time, to Lot One Shoppers Mall but despite that, there is no lift access, only stairs. The two newly constructed platforms at the LRT station began operations on 27 December that year. The two new side platforms, platforms 3 and 4, lack lift access so passengers who needs to take the lift when alighting at Choa Chu Kang LRT station have to wait for the doors to open to the island platform (platforms 1 and 2), where lift access is available. Stickers to remind passengers to exit at platforms 1 or 2 if they need a lift to exit are placed on all the LRT doors.

In 2016, platforms 1 and 2 of the LRT had half-height platform barriers installed. Choa Chu Kang (and Bukit Panjang) was the first to install half-height platform barriers due to the high commuter traffic at this station. Half-height platform barriers were installed at platforms 3 and 4 during construction. The half-height platform barriers are red in colour as compared to grey in colour on other parts of the line except Bukit Panjang Station. The red colour signifies the availability to transfer to the North-South Line which the line colour is red.

Jurong Region line interchange (2027)

On 9 May 2018, LTA announced that Choa Chu Kang station would become a terminus for the Jurong Region line (JRL). The station will be constructed as part of Phase 1, JRL (West), consisting of 10 stations between Choa Chu Kang, Boon Lay and Tawas, and is expected to be completed in 2027.

The platforms will be situated on the former site of the Choa Chu Kang Bus Interchange as well as HDB multi-storey carpark at Block 303 Choa Chu Kang Avenue 4, located to the west of the current station complex. While the JRL platform will be of a typical Island platform design, an additional platform will be constructed to allow cross platform transfer between the Jurong Region line services and North South line southbound services.

Contract J102 for the design and construction of Choa Chu Kang JRL station and associated viaducts, including Addition & Alteration works to the existing station complex, was awarded to Shanghai Tunnel Engineering Co. (Singapore) Pte Ltd at a sum of S$465.2 million. Construction will start in 2020, with completion in 2027. Contract J102 also includes the design and construction of Choa Chu Kang West station and Tengah station, and associated viaducts.

Demolition of an adjacent multi-storey car park started in December 2020 to make way for the expansion of the station.

Initially expected to open in 2026, the restrictions on the construction due to the COVID-19 pandemic has led to delays in the JRL line completion, and the date was pushed to 2027.

Incidents
On 7 April 2008, a man was hit by a train at Choa Chu Kang station at 8am, resulting in the disruption of northbound train services from Yew Tee to Bukit Gombak for about 50 minutes. He was subsequently pronounced dead by paramedics. A bus-bridging service was deployed between Yew Tee and Bukit Gombak stations as trains were made to turn around at Yew Tee, Bukit Gombak and Choa Chu Kang stations.

References

External links
 

Railway stations in Singapore opened in 1990
Choa Chu Kang
LRT stations of Bukit Panjang LRT Line
Mass Rapid Transit (Singapore) stations
Light Rail Transit (Singapore) stations